Federica Dal Ri (born 25 September 1980) is an Italian female long-distance runner who won a gold medal at the World Military Track and Field Championships.

Biography
She competed at three editions of the IAAF World Cross Country Championships, and five editions of the European Cross Country Championships.

She is married with the Italian long-distance runner Gabriele De Nard.

Achievements

National titles
She won seven national championships at senior level,
Italian Athletics Championships
5000 metres: 2009, 2010
10,000 metres: 2012
Marathon: 2017
 Cross country: 2017
 Cross country (short race): 2005
Italian Athletics Indoor Championships
3000 metres: 2010

References

External links
 

1980 births
Living people
Italian female long-distance runners
Athletics competitors of Gruppo Sportivo Esercito
Italian female cross country runners